Cornelius Nyungura (born 24 March 1977), known by his stage name Corneille,  is a Canadian R&B singer and songwriter. He was born in West Germany to Rwandan Tutsi parents, spent most of his childhood in Rwanda, and eventually emigrated to Quebec, Canada, in 1997. He sings in French and English. His work is greatly influenced by American funk and soul music; he is inspired by Prince, Marvin Gaye and Stevie Wonder.

Early life 
Corneille was born in Freiburg im Breisgau, Germany, although he spent much of his childhood in Rwanda. He discovered his passion for music in 1993, and so joined an R&B group, who won the Découverte 1993 competition. This also introduced him to songwriting and musical composition. However, his life changed after the Rwandan genocide in 1994. His father, Émile Nyungura, was a leader of the political party PSD thought to be opposed to the government and therefore a target; Corneille witnessed the assassination of his parents and his three brothers and sisters when he was 17 years old. He fled to Germany, where some of his parents' friends took him in.

Career 
In July 1997, Corneille decided to leave Germany in order to pursue studies in communication, and moved to Montreal, Canada, to attend Concordia University. During this time, he founded O.N.E., an R&B band, with Pierre Gage and Gardy Martin, whom he had met shortly after arriving in Quebec. Zoukin, one of the group's songs written by Corneille, rose to first place in Canadian airplay. Then, at the beginning of 2001, Corneille left the group, wishing to pursue a solo career. He began to centre his songs on his past.
During 2002, Corneille worked on various projects. He wrote and composed the songs "Ce soir" for the Cocktail R&B 2 compilation (Ghetto R&B, Sony Music) and "Si seulement on s'aimait" for Hip Hop Folies (Sony Music). Invited by Dave Stewart, he performed at his first showcase at the Réservoir in Paris, and had the chance to sing with Jimmy Cliff. In January 2003, he was invited to perform as an opening act for Cunnie Williams at the Olympia.

Corneille's first album, the Canadian version of Parce qu'on vient de loin, was released on 10 September 2002. The French version, which included numerous bonuses on the second disc, was released on 20 October 2003, and quickly became successful. In April 2003, Corneille sang with Craig David, repeating a verse in French in the song Rise and Fall. He undertook his first tour during May 2003, playing to full houses in Paris, Marseille, Lyon and Bordeaux. In March 2005, the singer participated in the concert Africa Live, which was organised to fight against (malaria) paludism. This was the first time that he had returned to his home continent since the genocide. Les marchands de rêves, Corneille's second album, was released in November 2005.
Corneille has worked with the Canadian Red Cross to raise awareness of children who are victims of war. He released his first English-language album, The Birth of Cornelius, in July 2007. In late 2014 he became a contestant on the fifth season of the French television channel TF1's Danse avec les Stars.

In 2022 he was chosen to be in "Manie Musicale" and won the tournament.

Eurovision 
Corneille wrote the song "Il était temps" for Virginie Pouchain after he qualified to represent France in the Eurovision Song Contest 2006. The song finished 22nd out of 24 finalists.

Personal life 
Corneille married Canadian model and actress Sofia de Medeiros in 2006; they have one child.

Discography

Albums 
Studio albums

Special editions
2003: Parce qu'on vient de loin (édition deluxe) (two discs)
2006: Parce qu'on vient de loin / Les marchands de rêves (double album rerelease)

Live albums and DVDs

Singles 

*Did not appear in the official Belgian Ultratop 50 charts, but rather in the bubbling under Ultratip charts.

As featured artist 

*Did not appear in the official Belgian Ultratop 50 charts, but rather in the bubbling under Ultratip charts.

DVDs 
2005: Live (coinciding with Live album)

Awards 
 2005 NRJ Music Awards Video of the Year for Parce qu'on vient de loin
 2005 EBBA Award.

References

External links 

 
 Discography

1977 births
Living people
21st-century Black Canadian male singers
German emigrants to Canada
Rwandan emigrants to Canada
Naturalized citizens of Canada
Rwandan male singers
French-language singers of Canada
Participants in French reality television series